WQQK (92Q) is an Urban Adult Contemporary FM radio station broadcasting in the Nashville, Tennessee market on a frequency of 92.1 MHz. Its transmitter site is in Goodlettsville, Tennessee (its city of license), and its studios are located in Nashville's Music Row district.

On October 16th, 1970, the station signed on as WHVT. The studios were at 361 Main Street in Hendersonville, TN with transmitter facilities on Campbell Road in Goodlettsville, TN. Hendersonville Broadcasting Corporation was the licensee, according to FCC Records. The transmitter facilities are in the same location today, according to FCC Records as well. In the 1970s, the station operated as WBYQ, branded as "92Q," and was the pioneering station of the "Top 40/CHR" format on the FM dial in the Nashville market. On July 1st, 1981, WBYQ known as "92Q" changed its call letters to WMAK-FM, which lasted until January 1st, 1984. On May 17, 1982. FCC Records show the station's license was transferred from Hendersonville Broadcasting Corporation to Phoenix of Hendersonville, Inc.(Samuel H. Howard). On January 31, 1984, the station's call sign was changed to WQQK and relaunched with an Urban contemporary format and the "92Q" well-known branding was brought back, however, there is evidence the station began its Urban Contemporary format in the late fall of 1982, under the WMAK-FM call sign. The late-night Quiet Storm program began in 1984. Around this time, WQQK's studios were moved to "then sister radio station" 1470 WVOL-AMs facilities, owned also by Phoenix Broadcasting, which is located north of Downtown Nashville. Despite competition with WUBT, WQQK is consistently one of the highest-rated stations in the area according to Arbitron, even though it broadcasts with only 3,000 watts of power. On August 8th, 1997, Phoenix of Hendersonville, Inc, and WQQK were transferred from Samuel H. Howard to Dickey Brothers Broadcasting Corporation LLC, per FCC Records. From this point, it has long been controlled by the Dickey family, who are also prominent figures in the Cumulus Media organization. In 2008, WQQK's City of License was changed from Hendersonville to Goodlettsville as part of a larger project that saw four of Cumulus' five Nashville stations change their cities of license.

Today, WQQK carries "The Kenny Smoov Morning Show" (who replaced Tom Joyner) in mornings), and D. L. Hughley (who replaced Michael Baisden) in afternoons. The station primarily plays R&B from the 1980s to now, as well as classic hip-hop.

On September 16, 2011, two of WQQK's sister stations, WRQQ and WNFN, were placed into an independent trust (Volt Radio, LLC) while Cumulus sought a buyer. The move was forced by FCC ownership limits following Cumulus' acquisition of Citadel Broadcasting, which resulted locally in WKDF and WGFX joining the Cumulus cluster. The FCC, as of 2011, allows a single company to own a maximum of five FM stations and two AM stations in any given market. To meet these guidelines in Nashville, Cumulus was forced to divest two of its seven FM stations, and the company chose WRQQ and WNFN, traditionally its two lowest-performing stations.

On November 14, 2011, Cumulus announced it was removing WRQQ from the Volt Radio trust, replacing it with WQQK. WQQK itself was removed from the trust on April 30, 2013.

WQQK broadcasts in HD.

References

External links
92-Q - Official Site

QQK
QQK
QQK
Cumulus Media radio stations
Radio stations established in 1970
1970 establishments in Tennessee